KMPS (910 AM) is a commercial radio station that is licensed to Hesperia, California and broadcasts to the Victor Valley area. It is owned by El Dorado Broadcasters and airs a Regional Mexican radio format with programming from La X 103.1. KMPS's offices and studios are in Hesperia; previously, they were on Hesperia Road in Victorville. The station's transmitter is located near Mesa Linda Street in Oak Hills. KMPS carried Los Angeles Angels baseball games before going silent in 2019.

History
The station signed on February 1, 1990 as KVVQ; initially, it broadcast middle of the road music and news/talk programming. On February 19, 2001, then-owner Infinity Broadcasting changed the call letters to KRAK; the call sign was formerly used by a well-known 50,000 watt country music station in Sacramento, which is now KHTK. On July 31, 2008, CBS Radio announced plans to sell its mid-size and small market stations (including KRAK) to focus more on major market clusters. However, such a sale was never consummated.

On November 15, 2011, KRAK changed its format from adult standards, branded "Stardust 910", to sports, branded as "910 ESPN". The previous ESPN Radio affiliate in the region, KVFG, began stunting with Christmas music, then switched to a classic hits format.
In September 2012, KRAK began a transition to CBS Sports Radio with hourly updates. The station dropped ESPN and began 24-hour broadcasts of CBS Sports Radio on January 2, 2013.

On February 2, 2017, CBS Radio announced it would merge with Entercom. The merger was approved on November 9, 2017, and was consummated on November 17. On December 11, 2017, the station took on the KMPS call sign, which was transferred from Seattle sister station KSWD. That station, in turn, acquired its current call letters from the Los Angeles radio station now known as KKLQ, which was divested by Entercom as part of its merger with CBS Radio.

On May 6, 2019, Entercom sold KMPS and KVFG to El Dorado Broadcasters for $1 million; the sale was completed on August 15. Afterwards, KMPS went silent due to financial reasons. As of August 2020, KMPS has returned to the air with a simulcast of KXVV’s Regional Mexican Format replacing the previous sports talk format.

References

External links

MPS
Radio stations established in 1990
1990 establishments in California
Regional Mexican radio stations in the United States
MPS (AM)
Hesperia, California